Aseel (Persian: 'Authentic') is an e-commerce marketplace which was launched in May 2019 by Nasrat Khalid to enable artisans to sell their products abroad. In August 2021 an emergency appeal for aid to Afghanistan was launched through the website.

Transport logistics 
In July 2021 concerns were reported by the company over potential difficulty fulfilling orders due to security concerns over transporting goods by road through Afghanistan.

Humanitarian aid 
As of August 2021, the company began humanitarian aid work in Kabul province, and have been able to successfully distribute over 3,000 emergency packs to assist internally displaced people with food and shelter. In 2020 Aseel also ran fundraising initiatives to help artisans who were suffering hardship through the on-going effects of the Covid-19 pandemic on production and marketing of their goods. Currently, they are working on methods to safely expand their emergency aid work through Afghanistan.

References

External links

E-commerce software
2018 establishments
Philanthropic organizations